Frog was a well-known British brand of flying model aircraft and scale model construction kits from the 1930s to the 1970s. The company's first model, an Interceptor Mk. 4, was launched in 1932, followed in 1936 by a range of 1:72 scale model aircraft kits made from cellulose acetate, which were the world's first.

Polystyrene models were introduced in 1955, which offered kits of aircraft, ships and cars in various scales. By the 1970s, Frog's catalogue included a large number of lesser-known aircraft types, manufactured only by the company, as well as a number of ship kits.

The last Frog-branded kits were produced in 1976, whereupon many of the Frog moulds were sold to the Soviet Union and marketed under the Novo name.

History 
Founded in 1931 by Charles Wilmot and Joe Mansour, International Model Aircraft Ltd. (IMA) originally used the Frog brand name (said to stand for "Flies Right Off the Ground") on the Interceptor Mk.4 semi-scale rubber-band powered flying model, launched the following year. Also in 1932, a marketing partnership with the toy company Lines Bros Ltd. was formed and other Frog brand flying models followed. In 1936, a range of 1:72 scale aircraft models in kit or pre-built form, moulded in cellulose acetate, was launched under the Frog Penguin name (alluding to the non-flying nature of these models). These were the world's first plastic model construction kits. An early release was the No.21P Empire Flying Boat, issued in 1938.

During the Second World War, the company produced flying models for target purposes and 1:72 scale aircraft recognition models. The Penguin range was dropped in 1949 but a new range of Frog polystyrene kits was introduced in 1955. A wide variety of aircraft, ship and car subjects in various scales were issued during the 1950s and 60s, 1:72 scale being standardised from 1963 onwards for aircraft models.

Production of scale and non-scale flying models continued into the early 1960s.

Frog's 1:72 line-up by the 1970s including a large number of lesser-known aircraft types that were not available from any other model manufacturer at the time, such as the Avro Shackleton, Martin Baltimore and Maryland, Vultee Vengeance, Curtiss Tomahawk, Blackburn Shark and Skua, Bristol 138 and Beaufort, Tupolev SB2, Supermarine Attacker and Scimitar, Armstrong Whitworth Whitley, Gloster Javelin, de Havilland Vampire, Hornet, and DH 110, Dewoitine D.520, Macchi MC202 Folgore, Fokker D21, Hawker Sea Fury and Tempest, Fairey Gannet, Barracuda and Firefly, General Aircraft Hotspur, Focke-Wulf Ta 152H, Messerschmitt Me 410, Arado Ar 234, Heinkel He 162, Dornier Do 335, Heinkel He 219, Gloster E.28/39, North American Mustang II, Vickers Vimy, Ryan NYP "Spirit of St Louis", de Havilland Gypsy Moth "Jason", and the Westland Wallace.

Frog also produced a line of larger-sized aircraft as 1:96 scale models, subjects including the Bristol Britannia, Douglas DC-7, Vickers Valiant, Avro Vulcan, Handley Page Victor, de Havilland Comet, and the Vickers Viscount. A lone airship model was of the R100.

In addition to aircraft models, Frog also produced a number of ship kits, four examples being the MV Shell Welder coastal oil tanker, the THLV South Goodwin Lightship, HMS Tiger, and an RNLI lifeboat.

From 1968, Frog issued around 30 ex-Hasegawa kits, mostly 1:72 scale modern jet fighters, some 1:32 scale WWII-era fighters and 1:450 scale battleships.

In France, due to cultural disquiet over the word "frog", these kits were sold and marketed under the "Tri-ang" brand, whilst in North America, for similar reasons, the Frog name was thought unacceptable and the kits were repackaged as "Air Lines" – an allusion to Lines Brothers Ltd – the founders of IMA / Tri-ang.

Demise 
In 1971, IMA's parent company, now Rovex Tri-ang, entered receivership and was acquired by Dunbee-Combex-Marx the following year. During the mid-1970s, some of the Frog kit moulds were transferred to various factories in the Soviet Union and the kits began to reappear under the Novo brand name. Moulds of Second World War Axis Powers subjects were acquired by Revell around 1977, the Axis types having been declined by Novo. The last Frog-branded kits were produced in 1976. In more recent years, some ex-Frog/Novo kits have been reissued by Revell and various East European manufacturers.

Model kit product ranges 

Model subjects produced by Frog over the years include:

 Aircraft 1:72, 1:96, and other scales, covering aircraft from World War I to Cold War era.
 Famous WarshipsVarious scales, mostly World War II era.

In popular culture 
On 9 December 2008 on the BBC2 programme "Flog It", a child's walking aid toy, namely a teddy bear on Tri-ang wheels, was shown being auctioned at Calder Valley auction house for the sum of £85.00. On the left flank of the bear is sewn a label stating that it was manufactured by International Model Aircraft Ltd.

See also 
 Airfix
 Aurora
 ESCI
 Hasegawa
 Heller
 Italeri
 Matchbox
 Monogram
 Revell
 Tamiya
 Skybirds

References

Notes

Bibliography 
 Lines, Richard and Hellström, Leif. Frog Model Aircraft, 1932–1976. London: New Cavendish Books,1989. .
 Lune, Peter van. "FROG Penguin plastic scale model kits 1936 – 1950". Zwolle, The Netherlands, 2017, published by author

External links 
 The Frog Penguin website
 The Path to Jetex
 Igor Krasnoselski's FROG aircraft models list
 Novo kits website  (defunct since 2018, working archive here)
 A 1937 Flight advertisement for Frog flying scale models
 A 1939 advertisement for Frog "Penguins" models
 a Frog 1960 flying models catalogue

Model manufacturers of the United Kingdom
Defunct companies of the United Kingdom
Defunct toy manufacturers
Manufacturing companies established in 1931
Lines Bros
Toy companies of the United Kingdom
Model aircraft
Manufacturing companies disestablished in 1976
1931 establishments in England
1976 disestablishments in England